The Akanksha Infertility Clinic is a women's health centre located in Anand, Gujarat, India, and
headed by Dr Nayna Patel. The clinic was founded in 1999, and was originally focused on In Vitro Fertilization. India declared commercial surrogacy legal in 2002; however the clinic did not begin to do surrogacy until 2004. Patel, who appeared on Oprah Winfrey's talk show in 2007, has produced more than 1000 surrogate babies as of October 2015.

Patel states that "we provide a legitimate service to those in need, whether it is the couple who desperately want a child or the woman who wishes to change her circumstances, to educate her children, build a house or pay off debts.”

Surrogacy
This works by the couple going to the clinic, requesting a surrogate, and essentially renting her womb for the next nine months. The surrogate will be implanted with the sperm and egg, and hopefully after having a successful birth, will give up the child to its parents. The women are then paid. Dr. Patel pays her surrogates around 400,000 rupees ($6,500). Couples are charged an average of $25,000 to $30,000 per baby.

Of the women who work as surrogates “nearly half described themselves as housewives and the rest were a mix of domestic, service, and manual laborers” . Most of them are married and have children of their own. They must live at the clinic, are heavily monitored and restricted, and are not allowed sex for the duration of their pregnancy. Their young children are allowed to stay with them, as a way to prevent to the women from getting attached to the baby they are carrying. During their required stay “residents are offered daily English classes and weekly lessons in computer use” and the director “arranges film screenings and gives out school backpacks and pencil boxes to surrogates’ children".

In India, “surrogacy...is slated to add $2 billion to the nation's gross domestic product”. So the country gets money, the surrogates get the needed money, and a couple gets a baby.

For comparison, in USA, the cost is $150,000, in a handful of states where it is permitted. 
For surrogates, the compensation outweighs the downside. A recent surrogate was the wife of an auto-rickshaw driver with three daughters of her own. she had to live in a hostel for nine months with 60 other surrogates so the clinic could monitor her health.

Akanksha claims an implantation success rate of 44%, similar to other Indian clinics, compared with a US norm of 31%.

Controversy

Regulations and Rights 
While surrogacy is legal, it is highly unregulated. There are laws in the progress of being made to attempt to aid the surrogate mothers. However it does “little to improve the life for women” and takes away their rights to decide whether they want an abortion or not. Another problem is that “lack of regulation could spark a price war for surrogacy”. This means that other countries could have surrogates willing to be paid a lower wage per baby carried. This leads to surrogate clinics basically competing against other clinics in other countries, creating a “race to the bottom.” If this happens then the protections for surrogate mothers could decrease; “with countries slowly under-cutting fees and legal protections for surrogates along the way”.

There are other cultural consequences as well. Women who are surrogates face the risk and consequences of being rejected from society or being discriminated against. There is another issue, the “dilemma of all rural surrogates: being suspected of adultery -a cause for shunning or worse”.

A huge controversy related to money was observed as per this article India's Baby Factory | Journeyman Pictures

Citizenship 
There was an issue of the citizenship of children, as many countries do not recognize surrogacy and these babies therefore have no legal standing

Baby Manji controversy
A Japanese baby girl born to an Indian surrogate mother was in legal limbo after the couple who had intended to raise her divorced. The three-month-old baby had been unable to leave India after her birth because she holds neither an Indian nor a Japanese nationality. The issue was resolved after the Japanese Government issued a one-year visa to her on humanitarian grounds, after the Indian Government had granted the baby a travel certificate in September in line with a Supreme Court direction.

Legislation

The Ban on Surrogacy 
In October 2015 a letter was sent by Indian Council of Medical Research (ICMR). The letter bans foreign couples getting Indian surrogates. This sparked public outcry and protests. People are concerned about the effect the ban will have on the economy of Anand.

The surrogacy industry has played a role in transforming the economy of Anand in India and financially bettering the lives of thousands of poor families and the government's recent move to ban the practice will wipe out incomes. “About 5,000 families in Anand are surviving on surrogacy,” says Dr Patel, whose clinic has been at the forefront of the country's commercial surrogacy sector. “There are the surrogates, the nannies, the rickshaw drivers, the hoteliers who employ hundreds of peoples, the restaurants, the shops. There are so many people directly or indirectly surviving on surrogacy, so it’s going to be a huge economic impact as far as Anand is concerned.”

Protections 
In 2008 a law - the Assisted Reproductive Technologies Bill (ART) - was introduced to protect surrogates, the children and the commissioning parents.

Dr Anup Gupta, the founder of Delhi IVF, a clinic that handles five to six cases a month said that "The legislation will facilitate surrogacy".

See also
 Anand, Gujarat
 Gynaecworld Clinic
 Commercial surrogacy in India
 Fertility tourism

References

External links
Draft, Assisted Reproductive Technologies Bill, MINISTRY OF HEALTH & FAMILY WELFARE
GOVT. OF INDIA, NEW DELHI

Obstetrics and gynaecology organizations
Healthcare in Gujarat
Anand district
Clinics in India